The Magnolias are an American band from Minneapolis, fronted by John  Freeman. They formed in 1984 and have had numerous line up changes throughout their history, with Freeman being the only continuing member. They have released 6 full-length LP's, including their latest 'Pop The Lock' in 2011.

History
The Magnolias formed in 1984 in Minneapolis, fronted by singer/guitarist/songwriter John Freeman. They played their first gig in early 1985 and by the end of that decade they had released 3 full-length LP's on local Minneapolis label Twin/Tone Records.

With a twin buzz-saw guitar attack, sturdy yet flexible rhythm section, John Freeman's inimitable caterwauling and top-notch song writing, the band created a sound that was instantly identifiable, as well as enduring. The Magnolias' high-energy American punk is consistently compared favorably to the band's influences, including The Clash, The Only Ones, The Undertones, The Real Kids and Buzzcocks.

They signed to Alias Records and issued one LP, 1992's Off The Hook and an EP Hung Up On, featuring some tracks taken from Off The Hook. Another album 'Street Date Tuesday' followed in 1996, with the band back on Twin/Tone.

The late 1990s and early 2000s saw a period of reduced activity for the band. In 2007 an album of unreleased demo's and outtakes was issued, titled 'Better Late Than Never'. They undertook their first European tour in 2008 and returned again in 2009.

The band released a new album in 2011 titled Pop The Lock. it was funded thanks to Kickstarter.com, the online donation site. They continue to play sporadic gigs.

Discography
 Concrete Pillbox (1986) - Twin/Tone
 For Rent (1988) - Twin/Tone
 Dime Store Dream (1989) - Twin/Tone
 Off The Hook (1992) - Alias
 Hung Up On (1992) - 6 track EP - Alias
 Street Date Tuesday (1996) - Twin/Tone
 Better Late Than Never (2007) - 13 unreleased demo's
 Pop The Lock (2011) - Veto Records

References

External links
 Pardon Me video
 Hello or Goodbye video

Alternative rock groups from Minnesota
Indie rock musical groups from Minnesota